Dancing Brasil Júnior is a Brazilian children's reality television series based on the ABC celebrity dance competition Dancing with the Stars: Juniors, produced by Endemol Shine in partnership with BBC Worldwide.

The show features celebrity children (either in their own right or having celebrity parentage) paired with professional junior ballroom dancers and mentored by an adult professional dancer from the main show. The couples compete against each other by performing choreographed dance routines in front of a panel of judges.

Unlike its parent series, the public's involvement was limited to the direct in-studio audience members during the show's recording. Each audience member used a hand-held device to score each dancing team, with the team having the highest combined score overall (judges and studio) becoming the winner.

It aired on Wednesday, 19 December 2018 at 10:30 p.m. (BRT / AMT) on RecordTV originally as a stand-alone Dancing Brasil special but also intended as a backdoor pilot for a potential spin-off full series.

Cast

Couples and mentors

Scoring chart

Key
 
 
  Eliminated
  Third place
  Runner-up
  Winner

Scores
Individual judges' scores in the charts below (given in parentheses) are listed in this order from left to right: Jaime Arôxa, Fernanda Chamma, Paulo Goulart Filho.

The couples performed cha-cha-cha, pasodoble, samba, waltz or jive.

Running order

Ratings and reception

Brazilian ratings
All numbers are in points and provided by Kantar Ibope Media.

 In 2018, each point represents 248.647 households in 15 market cities in Brazil (71.855 households in São Paulo)

References

External links 
 Dancing Brasil on R7.com

2010s Brazilian television series
2017 Brazilian television series debuts
Brazilian reality television series
Portuguese-language television shows
RecordTV original programming
Reality television spin-offs
Ballroom dance
Television series about children